The 1989 Dunedin mayoral election was part of the New Zealand local elections held that same year. In 1989, elections were held for the Mayor of Dunedin plus other local government positions including twelve city councillors. The polling was conducted using the standard first-past-the-post electoral method.

Background
Mayor Cliff Skeggs chose not to seek re-election and a record nine candidates sought to replace him. There were divisions on both sides of local politics in Dunedin. Councillor David Benson-Pope stood as the official Labour candidate, with Labour's candidate from the previous election Steve Alexander also standing. The Citizens' Association had divisions regarding their nominee. Michael Haggitt was chosen as their nominee over councillors Richard Walls and Ian McKeeking. Walls and McKeeking were overlooked due to their affiliations to the National Party. Both stood as independent candidates regardless.

Results
The following table shows the results for the election:

References

Mayoral elections in Dunedin
Dunedin
Politics of Dunedin
1980s in Dunedin
October 1989 events in New Zealand